The Frontier Conference is a college athletic conference affiliated with the National Association of Intercollegiate Athletics (NAIA). The conference was founded in 1934. Member institutions are located in the northwestern United States, in the states of Idaho, Montana, and Oregon.

History
The Montana Small College Conference (MSCC) was established in 1934 by the five smaller schools (Montana Technological University, the University of Montana Western, Montana State University–Northern, Intermountain Union College and Billings Polytechnic Institute) in the state. After a few seasons, the MSCC was renamed as the Montana Collegiate Conference (MCC) in 1936, with the additions of Montana State University Billings and Carroll College joining, as well as the merger of International Union and Billings Poly to become Rocky Mountain College. After nearly three decades, the conference reestablished itself under its current moniker in November 1966, containing the same six schools until 1974. The University of Providence (then the College of Great Falls) joined that year, however would only stay for a decade. MSU Billings left for the first incarnation of the Great Northwest Athletic Conference in 1988, leaving the Frontier at five members for another decade. The conference opened up outside of Montana for the first time in 1998, with schools from Idaho (Lewis–Clark State College) and Utah (Westminster College) joining. Great Falls re-joined in 1999. Dickinson State University joined in 2012, only to leave in 2014 to join the North Star Athletic Association (NSAA). Westminster (Utah) left for the National Collegiate Athletic Association (NCAA) Division II ranks and re-joined the Rocky Mountain Athletic Conference (RMAC) in 2015. Lewis–Clark State left for the Cascade Collegiate Conference as a full member in 2020.

Chronological timeline

 1934 - The Frontier Conference was founded as the Montana Small College Conference (MSCC). Charter members included the Billings Polytechnic Institute, Intermountain Union College, Montana State Normal College (now the University of Montana Western), Montana State School of Mines (now Montana Technological University) and Northern Montana College (now Montana State University–Northern), effective beginning the 1933-34 academic year.
 1936 - Carroll College of Montana and Eastern Montana Normal College (now Montana State University–Billings) joined the MSCC, alongside the merger of Billings Poly and Intermountain Union to form Rocky Mountain College. Therefore the MSCC has been renamed as the Montana Collegiate Conference (MCC), effective in the 1936-36 academic year.
 1966 - The MCC has been rebranded as the Frontier Conference, effective in the 1966-67 academic year.
 1974 - The College of Great Falls (later the University of Great Falls, now the University of Providence) joined the Frontier, effective in the 1974-75 academic year.
 1980 - Montana State–Billings left the Frontier to join the Division II ranks of the National Collegiate Athletic Association (NCAA) as an NCAA D-II Independent (which would later join the Great Northwest Conference, effective beginning the 1982-83 academic year), effective after the 1979-80 academic year.
 1984 - Great Falls left the Frontier as the school discontinued its athletic program, effective after the 1983-84 academic year.
 1998 - Lewis–Clark State College and Westminster College, effective in the 1998-99 academic year.
 1999 - Great Falls re-joined back to the Frontier after 15 years without an athletics program, effective in the 1999-2000 academic year.
 2008 - Eastern Oregon University joined the Frontier as an associate member for football, effective in the 2008 fall season (2008-09 academic year).
 2012 - Dickinson State University joined the Frontier, effective in the 2012-13 academic year.
 2012 - Southern Oregon University joined the Frontier as an associate member for football, effective in the 2012 fall season (2012-13 academic year).
 2014 - Dickinson State left the Frontier to join the North Star Athletic Association (NSAA), effective after the 2013-14 academic year.
 2014 - The College of Idaho joined the Frontier as an associate member for football, effective in the 2014 fall season (2014-15 academic year).
 2015 - Westminster (Utah) left the Frontier to join the NCAA Division II ranks and re-join back to the Rocky Mountain Athletic Conference (RMAC), effective after the 2014-15 academic year.
 2020 - Lewis–Clark State left the Frontier to join the Cascade Collegiate Conference (CCC), effective after the 2019-20 academic year.
 2022 - Arizona Christian University will join the Frontier as an associate member for football, effective beginning the 2023 fall season (2023-24 academic year).

Member schools
The Frontier Conference has 5 full members with football, 1 full member without football, and 3 football-only affiliate members. University of Providence does not field a football team. College of Idaho, Eastern Oregon and Southern Oregon are the football-only affiliates.

Current members
The Frontier currently has six full members, half are private schools:

Notes

Affiliate members
The Frontier currently has three affiliate members, only one of them is a private school:

Notes

Future affiliate members
The Frontier will have one new affiliate member, which will also be a private school:

Notes

Former members
The Frontier had four former full members, only one was a private school:

Notes

Membership timeline

Sports

The Frontier Conference sponsors athletic competition in men's and women's basketball, men's and women's cross country, men's football, men's and women's indoor and outdoor track and women's volleyball.

National championships

Basketball

Montana Western won the NAIA national title in Division I Women's basketball, in 2019.

Rocky Mountain won the national title in men's basketball, NAIA Division I, in 2009.

Montana State-Northern won the national title in women's basketball, NAIA Division II, in 1993.

Carroll reached the semi-finals in men's basketball in 2005, as did Lewis-Clark State in women's basketball in 2001.

Football

Carroll has won the NAIA national championship six times: four straight, from 2002 to 2005, also in  2007 and 2010, and has been runner-up twice.

Southern Oregon won the NAIA national championship in the 2014 season.

Montana Tech was the national runner-up in 1996.

Wrestling

Montana State-Northern has won six wrestling titles: 1991, 1992, 1998-2000, 2004, and was runner-up in 1990, 1993, and 2002.

Montana Western was co-champion in 1994.

In 2014, the University of Great Falls was second and Montana State-Northern took third at the NAIA national wrestling championship.

Bowling

College of Great Falls (now University of Providence) was the 1973 Men's NAIA National Bowling Champion.

See also

2012 Frontier Conference football season

References

External links

 
1935 establishments in the United States